Wapta Falls is a waterfall of the Kicking Horse River located in Yoho National Park in British Columbia, Canada. Its average flow can reach . The name stems from a Nakoda word meaning "river".

Use in a film 
Le Ruffian, (1983) - Actors; Lino Ventura, Bernard Giraudeau, Claudia Cardinale, Beatrix Van Til, Pierre Frag.

See also
List of waterfalls of British Columbia

References

Waterfalls of British Columbia
Yoho National Park
Kootenay Land District